Nerkin Chaylu (also, Nerk’in Chaylu, Ch’aylu, Getk, Nerkin Chailou, and Nerkin Chayly) is a village in the Tartar Rayon of Azerbaijan.

References 

Populated places in Tartar District